Ramp Run is a stream located in Brown Township entirely within Miami County, Ohio.

Ramp Run was named for the ramp, a type of wild onion cultivated by Indians.

See also
List of rivers of Ohio

References

Rivers of Miami County, Ohio
Rivers of Ohio